The Morrisville killings occurred on February 26, 2019, when Shana S. Decree and her daughter, Dominique K. Decree, allegedly killed five relatives, including three children, at their apartment in Morrisville, Pennsylvania.

Incident  
Police say Shana and Dominique said their family members wanted to die, so they and Shana's sister choked four to death before the sister was choked to death by Dominique. The bodies were later found after a social worker went to check on the house. A maintenance worker had to unlock the door after there was no response to the initial knocking. Shana and Dominique were then arrested for the deaths.

Legal proceedings 
Shana and Dominique Decree were charged with five counts of first degree murder and one count of conspiracy.

On Tuesday 18 February 2020, both suspects pleaded not guilty to all charges. A trial is set for 8 June 2020. However, an extension was given due to the judicial emergency declared in Bucks County amid the coronavirus outbreak in the state. Prosecutors then had three more months to pursue the death penalty for the two on the 28th September 2020.

The two were sentenced to life in prison without the death penalty after pleading guilty to 5 counts of first degree murder on September 28, 2020

References 

2019 in Pennsylvania
2010s crimes in Pennsylvania
Attacks in the United States in 2019
Familicides
February 2019 crimes in the United States
History of Bucks County, Pennsylvania